Harold George Bryant Davenport (January 19, 1866August 9, 1949) was an American film and stage actor who worked in show business from the age of six until his death. After a long and prolific Broadway career, he came to Hollywood in the 1930s, where he often played grandfathers, judges, doctors, and ministers. His roles include Dr. Meade in Gone with the Wind (1939) and Grandpa in Meet Me in St. Louis (1944). Bette Davis once called Davenport "without a doubt [. . .] the greatest character actor of all time."

Early life
Harry Davenport was born January 19, 1866, in Canton, Pennsylvania, where his family lived during the holidays. He also grew up in Philadelphia. Harry came from a long line of stage actors; his father was thespian Edward Loomis Davenport and his mother, Fanny Vining Davenport, was an English actress and a descendant of the renowned 18th-century Irish stage actor Jack Johnson. His sister was actress Fanny Davenport.

Career

He made his stage debut at the age of five in the play Damon and Pythias. Davenport made his Broadway debut in The Voyage of Suzette (1894) and appeared there in numerous plays.

Film career

Harry Davenport was one of the best-known and busiest "old men" in Hollywood films during the 1930s and 1940s. He started his film career at the age of 47, debuting in the 1913 silent short film Kenton's Heir. The next year, he starred in Fogg's Millions co-starring Rose Tapley. The film became the first in a series of silent comedy shorts. In addition, he also directed some silent features and many shorts between 1915 and 1917, including many of the films in the Mr. and Mrs. Jarr series.

Harry Davenport played Dr. Meade in Gone with the Wind (1939). Some of his other film roles are a lone resident in a ghost town in The Bride Came C.O.D. (1942), filmed on location in Death Valley, and the aged Louis XI of France in The Hunchback of Notre Dame (1939) with Charles Laughton, Maureen O'Hara and Cedric Hardwicke. He also had supporting roles in Alfred Hitchcock's thriller Foreign Correspondent (1940), William A. Wellman's western The Ox-Bow Incident (1943) and in Kings Row (1943) with Ronald Reagan. Davenport also played the grandfather of Judy Garland in Vincente Minnelli's classic Meet Me in St. Louis (1944) and the great-uncle of Myrna Loy and Shirley Temple in The Bachelor and the Bobby-Soxer (1947). His last film, Frank Capra's Riding High (1950), was released after his death.

Harry Davenport appeared in over 160 films. Asked why he made so many films at his age, he replied: 
I hate to see men of my age sit down as if their lives were ended and accept a dole. An old man must show that he knows his job and is no loafer. If he can do that, they can take their pension money and buy daisies with it.

Actors' Equity Association

In 1913, he co-founded, along with actor Eddie Foy, the Actors' Equity Association, an American labor union for actors. The original organization, known as the White Rats, was spearheaded by Davenport. After a nine-month stretch, the actors' group united in defiance of the appalling treatment of actors by theater owners such as the Shubert family and David Belasco, among others, by refusing to appear on stage by striking. The actions of the association caused the closure of all the theatres on Broadway, the only exception being theaters owned by George M. Cohan's company.

Personal life

He and his wife Alice were wed in 1893. They had one daughter, Dorothy Davenport, who also became an actress. After divorcing Alice in 1896, he married actress Phyllis Rankin, that same year. They had three biological children: Ned, Ann, and Kate, who all became actors. Harry also adopted Phyllis's son, Arthur Rankin (actor father of Arthur Rankin, Jr., founder of the Rankin/Bass animation studio). Actress Anne Seymour (born Anne Seymour Eckert) and her brother, radio personality Bill Seymour, were Harry Davenport's great-niece and great-nephew by their mother, May Davenport.

Through his marriage to Phyllis, he was the brother-in-law of Lionel Barrymore, who was married at the time to Phyllis' sister Doris. Phyllis's father, McKee Rankin, had been the top actor at the Arch Street Theater, which was run by Lionel's grandmother and Sidney's mother, Louisa Lane Drew. He was the grandfather of producer Dirk Wayne Summers, Arthur Rankin Jr., and Wallace Reid Jr.

After Phyllis's death, Davenport moved to Los Angeles and lived with his now-grown children. He died of a sudden heart attack at age 83, one hour after he asked his agent Walter Herzbrun about a new film role. He was buried in Kensico Cemetery, Westchester County, New York. In the obituary, a newspaper called him the "white-haired character actor" with "the longest acting career in American history".

Filmography

Actor

 Kenton's Heir (1913, Short) as The Doctor
 Too Many Husbands (1914, Short) as Dr. Crane
 The Accomplished Mrs. Thompson (1914, Short)
 Fogg's Millions (1914, Short)
 Rainy, the Lion Killer (1914, Short) as Jack Brown
 The Professional Scapegoat (1914, Short) as The Lawyer
Damon and Pythias (1914) as Phillistus
 C.O.D. (1914) as C.O. Darlington
 The Jarr Family Discovers Harlem (1915, Short) as Mr. Jarr
 Mr. Jarr Brings Home a Turkey (1915, Short) as Mr. Jarr
 Mr. Jarr and the Lady Reformer (1915, Short) as Mr. Jarr
 Mr. Jarr Takes a Night Off (1915, Short) as Mr. Jarr
 Mr. Jarr's Magnetic Friend (1915, Short) as Mr. Jarr
 The Closing of the Circuit (1915, Short) as Mary's Father
 The Jarrs Visit Arcadia (1915, Short) as Mr. Jarr
 Mr. Jarr and the Dachshund (1915, Short) as Mr. Jarr
 Mr. Jarr Visits His Home Town (1915, Short) as Mr. Jarr
 Mrs. Jarr's Auction Bridge (1915, Short) as Mr. Jarr
 Mrs. Jarr and the Beauty Treatment (1915, Short) as Mr. Jarr
 Mr. Jarr and the Ladies' Cup (1915, Short) as Mr. Jarr
 Philanthropic Tommy (1915, Short) as Mr. Moreland
 Mr. Jarr and Love's Young Dream (1915, Short) as Mr. Jarr
 Mr. Jarr and the Captive Maid (1915, Short) as Mr. Jarr
 Mr. Jarr and Gertrude's Beaux (1915, Short) as Mr. Jarr
 Mr. Jarr's Big Vacation (1915, Short) as Mr. Jarr
 Mr. Jarr and Circumstantial Evidence (1915, Short) as Mr. Jarr
 Mr. Jarr and the Visiting Firemen (1915, Short) as Mr. Jarr
 Mrs. Jarr and the Society Circus (1915, Short) as Mr. Jarr
 Father and the Boys (1915) as Tobias Ford
 One Night (1916)
 Fashion and Fury (1916, Short) as The Gardener
 O'Hagan's Scoop (1916, Short) as The City Editor
 The Wheel of the Law (1916) as John Daniels
 The Father of Her Child (1916, Short) as Farmer Gray
 The Heart of a Fool (1916, Short) as Abe Peters, aka Gash
 Sowers and Reapers (1917) as Henry Ainsworth
 The Planter (1917) as Short
 The Unknown Quantity (1919) as Septimus Kinsolving
 A Girl at Bay (1919) as Frank Galt
 Among Those Present (1921, Short) (uncredited)
 My Sin (1931) as Roger Metcalf
 His Woman (1931) as Customs Inspector (uncredited)
 The Wiser Sex (1932) as Rolfe's Defense Attorney (uncredited)
 Get That Venus (1933) as Mr. Rendleby
 The Scoundrel (1935) as Slezack
 The Case of the Black Cat (1936) as Peter Laxter
 Legion of Terror (1936) as Senator Morton (uncredited)
 Three Men on a Horse (1936) as Williams
 Four Days' Wonder (1936) as Ticket Agent
 King of Hockey (1936) as Tom McKenna
 Under Cover of Night (1937) as Dr. Reed
 Paradise Express (1937) as Jed Carson
 Her Husband's Secretary (1937) as Dan Kingdon
 Maytime (1937) as Opera Director (uncredited)
 As Good as Married (1937) as Jessup
 Armored Car (1937) as Pop Logan
 Fly-Away Baby (1937) as Colonel Higgam
 They Won't Forget (1937) as Confederate Soldier
 White Bondage (1937) as Pop Craig
 The Life of Emile Zola (1937) as Chief of Staff
 Mr. Dodd Takes the Air (1937) as Doc Jeremiah George Quinn
 Fit for a King (1937) as Archduke Julio
 Radio Patrol (1937, Serial) as John P. Adams
 The Perfect Specimen (1937) as Carl Carter
 The Great Garrick (1937) as Innkeeper of Turk's Head (uncredited)
 First Lady (1937) as Charles
 Wells Fargo (1937) as Ingalls - Banker
 Man-Proof (1938) as Hitch-Hiking Old Man (uncredited)
 Gold Is Where You Find It (1938) as Dr. Parsons
 Reckless Living (1938) as 'General' Jeff
 The First Hundred Years (1938) as Uncle Dawson
 The Higgins Family (1938) as Grandpa William Jordan
 The Rage of Paris (1938) as Pop - the Caretaker
 Young Fugitives (1938) as Joel Bentham
 Marie Antoinette (1938) as Monsieur de Cosse (uncredited)
 You Can't Take It with You (1938) as Night Court Judge
 The Sisters (1938) as Doc Moore
 The Cowboy and the Lady (1938) as Uncle Hannibal Smith
 Orphans of the Street (1938) as Doc Will Ramsey
 Saleslady (1938) as Miles Cannon
 Long Shot (1939) as Henry Sharon
 Made for Each Other (1939) as Dr. Healy (uncredited)
 Tail Spin (1939) as T.P. Lester
 The Story of Alexander Graham Bell (1939) as Judge Rider
 Juarez (1939) as Dr. Samuel Basch
 My Wife's Relatives (1939) as Grandpa Ed Carson
 Exile Express (1939) as Dr. Hite
 Should Husbands Work? (1939) as Grandpa Higgins
 Death of a Champion (1939) as Guy Lanyard
 The Covered Trailer (1939) as Grandpa Ed Carson
 Gone with the Wind (1939) as Dr. Meade
 The Hunchback of Notre Dame (1939) as King Louis XI
 Money to Burn (1939) as Grandpa Ed Carson
 Dr. Ehrlich's Magic Bullet (1940) as Judge
 Granny Get Your Gun (1940) as Nate
 Too Many Husbands (1940) as George
 Grandpa Goes to Town (1940) as Grandpa
 All This, and Heaven Too (1940) as Pierre
 Lucky Partners (1940) as Judge
 Foreign Correspondent (1940) as Mr. Powers
 Earl of Puddlestone (1940) as Grandpa Ed Carson
 I Want a Divorce (1940) as Grandpa Brokaw
 Meet John Doe (1941) as Former Bulletin Owner (uncredited)
 I Wanted Wings (1941) as 'Sandbags' Riley
 That Uncertain Feeling (1941) as Jone
 The Bride Came C.O.D. (1941) as Pop Tolliver
 Hurricane Smith (1941) as Robert Ingersoll Reed
 One Foot in Heaven (1941) as Elias Samson
 Son of Fury: The Story of Benjamin Blake (1942) as Amos Kidder
 Kings Row (1942) as Colonel Skeffington
 Larceny, Inc. (1942) as Homer Bigelow
 Ten Gentlemen from West Point (1942) as Bane
 Tales of Manhattan (1942) as Professor Lyons
 The Amazing Mrs. Holliday (1943) as Commodore Thomas Spencer Holliday
 Shantytown (1943) as 'Doc' Herndon
 The Ox-Bow Incident (1943) as Arthur Davies
 We've Never Been Licked (1943) as Pop Lambert
 Headin' for God's Country (1943) as Clem Adams
 Princess O'Rourke (1943) as Supreme Court Judge
 Gangway for Tomorrow (1943) as Fred Taylor
 Government Girl (1943) as Senator MacVickers
 Jack London (1943) as Prof. Hilliard
 December 7th (1943) as Mr. 'C'
 Kismet (1944) as Agha
 The Impatient Years (1944) as Minister
 Meet Me in St. Louis (1944) as Grandpa
 Music for Millions (1944) as Doctor
 The Thin Man Goes Home (1945) as Dr. Bertram Charles
 This Love of Ours (1945) as Dr. Wilkerson
 She Wouldn't Say Yes (1945) as Albert
 Too Young to Know (1945) as Judge Boller
 The Enchanted Forest (1945) as Old John
 Pardon My Past (1945) as Grandpa Pemberton
 Adventure (1945) as Dr. Ashlon
 Claudia and David (1946) as Dr. Harry
 Courage of Lassie (1946) as Judge Payson
 G.I. War Brides (1946) as Grandpa Giles
 Faithful in My Fashion (1946) as Great Grandpa
 Three Wise Fools (1946) as The Ancient
 Lady Luck (1946) as Judge Martin
 A Boy and His Dog (1946, Short) as Squire Jim Kirby
 The Farmer's Daughter (1947) as Dr. Matthew Sulven
 Stallion Road (1947) as Dr. Stevens
 Keeper of the Bees (1947) as Michael Worthington
 The Bachelor and the Bobby-Soxer (1947) as Judge Thaddeus Turner
 That Hagen Girl (1947) as Judge Merrivale
 The Fabulous Texan (1947) as Rev. Baker
 Three Daring Daughters (1948) as Dr. Cannon
 The Man from Texas (1948) as 'Pop' Hickey
 That Lady in Ermine (1948) as Luigi
 For the Love of Mary (1948) as Justice Peabody
 The Decision of Christopher Blake (1948) as Courtroom Attendant
 Down to the Sea in Ships (1949) as Benjamin Harris
 Little Women (1949) as Dr. Barnes
 That Forsyte Woman (1949) as Old Jolyon Forsyte
 Tell It to the Judge (1949) as Judge MacKenzie Meredith
 Riding High (1950) as Johnson (final film)

Director

 The Island of Regeneration (1915)
 The Jarr Family Discovers Harlem (1915, Short)
 Mr. Jarr Brings Home a Turkey (1915, Short)
 Mr. Jarr and the Lady Reformer (1915, Short)
 The Enemies (1915, Short)
 Mr. Jarr Takes a Night Off (1915, Short)
 Mr. Jarr's Magnetic Friend (1915, Short)
 The Closing of the Circuit (1915, Short)
 The Jarrs Visit Arcadia (1915, Short)
 Mr. Jarr and the Dachshund (1915, Short)
 Mr. Jarr Visits His Home Town (1915, Short)
 Mrs. Jarr's Auction Bridge (1915, Short)
 Mrs. Jarr and the Beauty Treatment (1915, Short)
 Mr. Jarr and the Ladies' Cup (1915, Short)
 Philanthropic Tommy (1915, Short)
 Mr. Jarr and Love's Young Dream (1915, Short)
 Mr. Jarr and the Captive Maid (1915, Short)
 Mr. Jarr and Gertrude's Beaux (1915, Short)
 Mr. Jarr's Big Vacation (1915, Short)
 Mr. Jarr and Circumstantial Evidence (1915, Short)
 Mr. Jarr and the Visiting Firemen (1915, Short)
 Mrs. Jarr and the Society Circus (1915, Short)
 The Woman in the Box (1915, Short)
 The Making Over of Geoffrey Manning (1915)
 For a Woman's Fair Name (1916)
 The Supreme Temptation (1916)
 Myrtle the Manicurist (1916, Short)
 The Rookie (1916, Short)
 The Resurrection of Hollis (1916, Short)
 O'Hagan's Scoop (1916, Short)
 Carew and Son (1916, Short)
 Letitia (1916, Short)
 The Heart of a Fool (1916, Short)
 A Woman Alone (1917)
 Tillie Wakes Up (1917)
 The Millionaire's Double (1917)
 The False Friend (1917)
 A Son of the Hills (1917)
 A Man's Law (1917)

References

Further reading

External links

 
 
 Obituary
 "Harry Davenport Biography" by Hal Erickson, Allmovie 
 Harry Davenport and Phyllis Rankin family papers, 1857-circa 1946, held by the Billy Rose Theatre Division, New York Public Library for the Performing Arts

1866 births
1949 deaths
American male film actors
American male silent film actors
American people of English descent
Silent film directors
People from Canton, Pennsylvania
Male actors from Philadelphia
19th-century American male actors
American male stage actors
20th-century American male actors
Burials at Kensico Cemetery
Film directors from Pennsylvania